The enzyme acylcarnitine hydrolase (EC 3.1.1.28) catalyzes the reaction 

O-acylcarnitine + H2O  a fatty acid + L-carnitine

This enzyme belongs to the family of hydrolases, specifically those acting on carboxylic ester bonds.  The systematic name is O-acylcarnitine acylhydrolase. Other names in common use include high activity acylcarnitine hydrolase, HACH, carnitine ester hydrolase, palmitoylcarnitine hydrolase, palmitoyl-L-carnitine hydrolase, long-chain acyl-L-carnitine hydrolase, and palmitoyl carnitine hydrolase.

References

 
 

EC 3.1.1
Enzymes of unknown structure